Araeomorpha diplopa is a moth in the family Crambidae. It is found in Australia, where it has been recorded from New South Wales and Queensland.

References

Acentropinae
Moths of Australia
Moths described in 1903